The 1968–69 Rugby Union County Championship was the 69th edition of England's premier rugby union club competition at the time.

Lancashire won their eighth title after defeating Cornwall in the final.

Final

See also
 English rugby union system
 Rugby union in England

References

Rugby Union County Championship
County Championship (rugby union) seasons